The Tacuarineros de Culiacán baseball club was one of the four original founding members of the Mexican Pacific Coast League, a minor league circuit that operated in Mexico in the seasons from 1945-46 through 1957-58. They were managed by Manuel Arroyo.

The Tacuarineros were based in Culiacán, the capital of the state of Sinaloa, and played its home games at the Autonomous University of Sinaloa ballpark in their first three seasons. They moved to the Estadio General Ángel Flores for the 1948-49 season, when they won the first of their five pennants, repeating in the 1949–50, 1950–51, 1951–52 and 1955-56 campaigns.

Notable players
Luke Easter : MPCL Most Valuable Player (1955–56)
Johnny Ritchey : Tacuarineros Best Player (1953–54)

Sources

Further reading
Bjarkman, Peter (2005). Diamonds around the Globe: The Encyclopedia of International Baseball. Greenwood.

External links
ESPN Deportes

Baseball teams in Mexico
Defunct baseball teams in Mexico
Baseball teams established in 1945
Baseball teams disestablished in 1958
1945 establishments in Mexico
1958 disestablishments in Mexico
Sport in Culiacán